Qianjiadian Town is a town in the Yanqing District of Beijing. It shares border with Dongmao Town to the north, Baoshan Town and Zhenzhuquan Township to the east, Sihai Town and Liubinbao Township to the south, and Xiangying Township to the west. Its population was 6,273 as of 2020.

Geography 
Qianjiadian Town is located within a basin of the Yan Mountain Range, with Hei River flowing through its north and Bai River flowing through its south. It is connected to Luanchi and Liusha Roads.

History

Administrative divisions 
In 2021, Qianajiadian Town covered 20 subdivisions, with the following 1 community and 19 villages:

Gallery

See also 

 List of township-level divisions of Beijing

References

Yanqing District
Towns in Beijing